is a Japanese actress and model. She is best known for her roles in The World of Kanako, Destruction Babies, Drowning Love, The Black Devil and the White Prince, My Tomorrow, Your Yesterday, After the Rain, Farewell Song, Threads: Our Tapestry of Love and Sakura. She made her Hollywood debut role in the film Silence.

Personal life 
Komatsu was born in Tokyo. She married fellow actor Masaki Suda on November 15, 2021. They had reportedly been dating since September 2019. They co-starred in three films: Destruction Babies, Drowning Love and Threads - Our Tapestry of Love.

Career
Komatsu made her film debut in The World of Kanako and won numerous Best New Actress awards including the Newcomer of The Year award at the 38th Japan Academy Film Prize. She has been a House Ambassador for Chanel since 2015. She had a contract with Stardust Promotion. In 2016, she played a minor role in Martin Scorsese's film Silence.

Komatsu was nominated for Outstanding Performance by an Actress in a Supporting Role award at the 43rd Japan Academy Film Prize for her role in the film Family of Strangers. She starred in the sixth highest grossing Japanese film of 2020, Threads: Our Tapestry of Love. She was nominated in the Outstanding Performance by an Actress in a Leading Role category at the 44th Japan Academy Film Prize for her role in the film Threads: Our Tapestry of Love. 

In 2021, Komatsu starred in the films Moonlight Shadow and Parasite in Love. In 2022, she starred with Kentaro Sakaguchi in the film The Last 10 Years, which had grossed over 3 billion yen and it was ranked at #8 for the highest grossing Japanese film in 2022. 

In 2023, Komatsu became the face of Chanel Fall/Winter 2023-2024 Ready to Wear collection. She becomes the first Japanese national to be featured as a face of collection for a luxury brand.

Filmography

Film

Television

Video on demand

Music videos

Awards and nominations

References

External links
  at Stardust Promotion 
 
 

Nana Komatsu TM 2008-2022

1996 births
Actresses from Tokyo
Japanese female models
Japanese film actresses
Japanese television actresses
Living people
Stardust Promotion artists
21st-century Japanese actresses
Models from Tokyo Metropolis